Ranitomeya flavovittata is a species of frog in the family Dendrobatidae. It is endemic to Peru and known with certainty only from the Loreto Region where its type locality is.

Habitat and conservation
Ranitomeya flavovittata occur in old-growth and secondary tropical forests. They seem to use Guzmania bromeliads for breeding. Habitat loss and pet trade are threats to the species.

References

Ranitomeya
Amphibians of Peru
Endemic fauna of Peru
Amphibians described in 1999
Taxonomy articles created by Polbot